Jessica "Jess" Hanson (born September 13, 1986) is an American politician serving in the Minnesota House of Representatives since 2021. A member of the Minnesota Democratic-Farmer-Labor Party (DFL), Hanson represents District 55A in the southern Twin Cities metropolitan area, which includes the cities of Burnsville and Savage and parts of Dakota and Scott Counties.

Early life, education and career 
Hanson was born and raised in Minnesota. She earned a Bachelor of Science in social work from St. Catherine University and a Master of Arts in advocacy and political leadership from Metropolitan State University. Hanson has worked as a dental network representative for Anthem since 2007.

Prior to her election to the legislature, Hanson led the Minnesota Campaign for Full Legalization, a nonprofit advocacy group focused on marijuana legalization.

Minnesota House of Representatives
Hanson was elected to the Minnesota House of Representatives in 2020 and was reelected in 2022. She first ran after one-term DFL incumbent Hunter Cantrell announced he would not seek reelection. Hanson defeated former Republican representative and state auditor candidate Pam Myhra in the general election. In 2020, Hanson had her election results challenged, however the case was dismissed by a judge for failing to state a claim and a lack of subject-matter jurisdiction.

Hanson serves as vice chair of the Economic Development Finance and Policy Committee, and sits on the Children and Families Finance and Policy, Higher Education Finance and Policy, and Human Services Policy Committees.

Hanson was the author of "Travis's Law," a law that requires 911 operators to refer calls to mental health teams trained to de-escalate serious mental health episodes. The bill was named after Travis Jordan, a man considering suicide who was shot and killed by Minneapolis police in 2018. Hanson's bill passed with bipartisan support and was signed by Governor Walz.

Hanson has been an advocate for the legalization of marijuana in Minnesota, arguing it should be done through legislation and not a constitutional referendum. She has stated that regulating marijuana would benefit public health and public safety.

Hanson authored legislation to repeal a gag order on the study for a Dan Patch commuter rail line that would link Northfield, Minnesota to Minneapolis. Hanson stated the line, which would run through Savage, Minnesota, could improve public transportation in her district. In February of 2022 in response to high gas prices, she joined other DFL legislators advocating for a temporary repeal of the state gas tax.

Hanson signed on to a letter calling on the Biden administration to stop Line 3, a tar sands pipeline proposed to cut through Minnesota tribal lands.

Electoral history

Personal life 
Hanson lives in Burnsville, Minnesota and has two children.

References

External links 

 Official House of Representatives website
 Official campaign website

Living people
University of Northwestern – St. Paul alumni
St. Catherine University alumni
Metropolitan State University alumni
Democratic Party members of the Minnesota House of Representatives
Women state legislators in Minnesota
21st-century American politicians
21st-century American women politicians
1986 births